Acacia fagonioides is a shrub of the genus Acacia and the subgenus Pulchellae that is endemic to an area of south western Australia.

Description
It blooms from June to July and produces yellow flowers. The simple inflorescences are found over halfway up an axillary spine and have spherical flower-heads containing 13 to 25 yellow coloured flowers.

Taxonomy
The shrub belongs to the Acacia pulchella group of wattles and is similar in appearance to Acacia epacantha.

Distribution
It is native to an area in the Wheatbelt region of Western Australia where it is typically found on sandplains growing in sandy soils. It has a disjunct distribution with population found near Toodyay, Cervantes and Eneabba where it is usually a part of heathland or Corymbia calophylla forest communities.

See also
List of Acacia species

References

fagonioides
Acacias of Western Australia
Taxa named by George Bentham
Plants described in 1842